{{DISPLAYTITLE:C16H25NO}}
The molecular formula C16H25NO (molar mass: 247.38 g/mol) may refer to:

 Butidrine, also called hydrobutamine
 5-OH-DPAT
 7-OH-DPAT
 8-OH-DPAT
 Picenadol, an opioid analgesic drug

Molecular formulas